The Rinspeed Presto is a concept car from the Swiss company Rinspeed, unveiled in 2002. At the touch of a button, it would expand it from a 2.7 metre, two-seat cabrio to a 3.6 metre, four-seater. It has a Pre-Peg Composite plastic body and runs on natural gas.

The transformation is made possible by a centrally located electric motor, which stretches the vehicle with the help of two mechanical screw-and-nut gears by exactly 746 millimetres to its full extended length of 3.74 metres. The longitudinal members run on low-friction precision rollers and disappear like a drawer in the rear of the floor pan. Despite its variable length the engineers succeeded in designing the adjustable floor pan with the torsional rigidity necessary for a roadster. To ensure absolute operational safety the extension mechanism also features self-locking safety latches. The car lacks a roof and doors.

Conversion: A four-cylinder, 1.7-litre common-rail turbo diesel engine in dual-fuel configuration, based on a Mercedes-Benz, runs on a mixture of natural gas and diesel fuel at a 40/60 ratio. Natural gas is a very clean-burning fuel, which consists almost entirely of methane with sulfur content near zero. However, since a diesel engine has no spark plug to act as an ignition source, operation on natural gas alone is technically impossible. The operating principle of the dual-fuel engine is simple: Natural gas is injected into the intake air of the engine. Just like in the production engine the diesel fuel is injected into the combustion chamber where it ignites a mixture of natural gas and air rather than just plain air.

To configure the turbocharged in-line engine for dual-fuel operation, a number of modifications are required, including installation of a tank for the natural gas and a gas-injection system. At the heart of the modifications is a reprogrammed engine management system. Should the system malfunction it reverts to the standard diesel mapped ignition, thus offering the same reliability as the production car.

External links 
Rinspeed Presto on the Rinspeed site

Concept cars
Sports cars

Rinspeed vehicles